Mairtown is a suburb of Whangārei, in Northland Region, New Zealand. It is about 2 kilometres north of the city centre. Mair Park runs between Mairtown and the Hātea River.

The area is named for the early settler Mair Family, including Gilbert Mair and his son Robert. Robert donated the land which is now Mair Park to the city in 1914. Tawatawhiti / Mair's Landing on the Hātea River is on the New Zealand Heritage List.

Demographics

Mairtown had a population of 2,475 at the 2018 New Zealand census, an increase of 210 people (9.3%) since the 2013 census, and an increase of 270 people (12.2%) since the 2006 census. There were 1,083 households, comprising 1,101 males and 1,377 females, giving a sex ratio of 0.8 males per female. The median age was 47.6 years (compared with 37.4 years nationally), with 399 people (16.1%) aged under 15 years, 402 (16.2%) aged 15 to 29, 948 (38.3%) aged 30 to 64, and 723 (29.2%) aged 65 or older.

Ethnicities were 77.3% European/Pākehā, 27.2% Māori, 3.6% Pacific peoples, 6.7% Asian, and 1.7% other ethnicities. People may identify with more than one ethnicity.

The percentage of people born overseas was 19.4, compared with 27.1% nationally.

Although some people chose not to answer the census's question about religious affiliation, 43.9% had no religion, 40.2% were Christian, 1.9% had Māori religious beliefs, 0.7% were Hindu, 0.2% were Muslim, 0.7% were Buddhist and 2.7% had other religions.

Of those at least 15 years old, 360 (17.3%) people had a bachelor's or higher degree, and 507 (24.4%) people had no formal qualifications. The median income was $25,200, compared with $31,800 nationally. 222 people (10.7%) earned over $70,000 compared to 17.2% nationally. The employment status of those at least 15 was that 819 (39.5%) people were employed full-time, 255 (12.3%) were part-time, and 81 (3.9%) were unemployed.

Notes

Populated places in the Northland Region
Suburbs of Whangārei